Jyamaruk is a village development committee in Dhading District in the Bagmati Zone of central Nepal. At the time of the 1991 Nepal census it had a population of 6888 and had 1285 houses in it.

References

Populated places in Dhading District